The 2019 World Taekwondo Grand Prix was the 7th edition of the World Taekwondo Grand Prix series. 

The Grand Prix Final in Moscow served as qualification for the 2020 Summer Olympics, the winners from each category earned their NOCs a qualification.

Schedule

Men

58 kg

68 kg

80 kg

+80 kg

Women

49 kg

57 kg

67 kg

+67 kg

Medal table

References

External links
World Taekwondo calendar 

World Taekwondo Grand Prix
Grand Prix